Korean units of measurement, called cheokgwan-beop or cheokgeun-beop in Korean, is the traditional system of measurement used by the people of the Korean peninsula. It is largely based on the Chinese system, with influence from Japanese standards imposed following its annexation of the Korean Empire in 1910. Both North and South Korea currently employ the metric system. Since 2007, South Korea has criminalized the use of Korean units in commercial contexts but informal use continues, especially of the pyeong as a measure of residential and commercial floorspace. North Korea continues to use the traditional units, although their standards are now derived from metric conversions.

History

Ancient Korea
Customary Korean units are a local adaption of the traditional Chinese system, which was adopted at a very early date. They were imposed and adjusted at various times by royal statutes. The details of the system have varied over time and location in Korea's history. Standardization—to the extent it occurred—was accomplished by officially sanctioned rulers, ropes, odometers, triangulation devices, weights, cups, and basins.

Although most of the measures operate on a decimal system, the standard form was to read out the units of each place (as, e.g., 3cheok, 1chon, 4bun, 1ri) rather than list them as a single number of the largest unit (as 3.141cheok).

Joseon Kingdom
Yi Dan established a Market Bureau or Bureau of Weights and Measures at the foundation of the Joseon dynasty in 1392. The Joseon Kingdom later attempted a standardization of length based on square brass rulers, which were used by magistrates and the secret police to fight commercial fraud. Under the Joseon, different classes of society were permitted different numbers of kan in their homes, but in its traditional sense—like the Japanese ken—of a bay between two pillars rather than as a set unit of length.

The 1496 Great Codex of State Administration (Kyŏngguk Taejŏn) included a section on approved measures and their verification. It employed a li of 360paces or 2160feet, but did not explicitly mention that conversion until its 1746 supplement.

The 1897 Law on Weights and Measures uniting Korea's various local systems was the first legislation enacted upon the Joseon's establishment of the Korean Empire.

Japanese Chōsen
During the Japanese occupation from 1910 to 1945, Japan imposed its standards on Korea. Two of the most common "traditional" units in Korea—the pyeong of floorspace and the jeweler's don—were among those given their modern value by the Japanese.

South Korea
South Korea signed the Metre Convention in 1959 and notionally adopted the metric system under Park Chung-hee on 10 May 1961, with a strict law banning the use of the Korean pound, li, gwan, and don effective as of 1 January 1964 and—after metric conversion of the land registries—the pyeong. The metrication was not applied to imported or exported goods and remained so generally spotty as to be considered a failure, with the government abandoning its attempts to enforce the statute by 1970. The traditional units feature in many Korean sayings and much of its literature and poetry, including the national anthem, which mentions Korea's "three thousand lis of rivers and mountains". Further attempts to fully metricate occurred in 1983, 2000, and 2001, with publicity campaigns praising the metric system and condemning traditional units through TV and radio ads, brochures, signs, and contests. A common theme was the origin of the present values of the units under Japanese occupation; Yun Byeong-su of the Korea Association of Standards & Testing Organizations noted that "even Japan has forsaken the don for the units of grams and ounces but here we are standing around like idiots still blathering on about don." Nonetheless, strong opposition from the construction and jewelry industries and negative media coverage forced Korean politicians to avoid the topic and regulators to settle for dual use of conventional and metric measures.

A 2006 study found 88% of real estate companies and 71% of jewelers in 7 major markets were still using the pyeong and don, after which the government decided simply to criminalize further commercial use of traditional units. (Another important factor was the European Union regulation mandating the use of metric in all imported goods by 2010.) The sale of rulers marking Korean feet was ended and a Measure Act effective 1 July 2007 empowered the Korean Agency for Technology and Standards of the Ministry of Commerce to begin immediately levying fines of up to ₩500,000 for commercial use of the pyeong and don, with less common units enjoying a longer grace period. The ban also included use of American units, such as describing the display size of televisions and computer monitors in terms of inches. The "serving size" used as an informal and variable measure of meat cuts was standardized to 100g. Knowledge of the fine remained low for years, and it was later increased to a maximum of ₩1,000,000 (about $800) for users of illegal units and ₩3,000,000 for sellers of measuring devices marked with unapproved units. South Korea's measurement standards are now maintained by the Korea Research Institute of Standards and Science.

Despite this strong official discouragement, some use continues in retail, manufacturing, and farming. Even among those who have adopted metric units, informal use of awkward metric fractions equivalent to round amounts of the former units is common, especially with regard to the very common pyeong of floorspace. (Such treatment was avoided in the gold market by laws requiring pricing and denomination in even amounts of grams.) Another dodge has been to treat the traditional units as a nondescript 'unit', such as marketing an air conditioner appropriate for a 20py home as a "20-Type".

North Korea
Despite the importance of the Soviet Union in establishing North Korea, Kim Il-sung continued official use of Korean units until the DPRK's notional metrication under National Standard 4077-75 in 14 April 1975. It joined the Meter Treaty in 1982 or 1989, although it was removed from the International Bureau for Weights and Measures and related organizations in 2012 for its years of failure to pay the necessary fees. North Korea has long used the metric system in its state-run media and international publications, but continues to use traditional units alongside the metric system in sectors approved by the government. North Korea's standards are administered by the Central Institute of Metrology under the State Administration of Quality Management in accordance with the Law on Metrology ratified by the Supreme People's Assembly on 3 February 1993. North Korea uses the pyeong in various regulations, such as the 50py per person allowed for private farming in 1987, despite guides who disparage the unit as a historical relic of the South to foreign tourists visiting the country. The metric system is thought not to have spread to domestic factories or stores prior to Kim Jong-un's metrification initiative, announced in May 2013. The change was part of Kim's policy of stressing the importance of science and technology and its "universal trends". His announcement in the state-run quarterly Cultural Language Study said that increasing use of the metric system would "strengthen international exchange and cooperation... in the fields of industry, science, and technology and even in the area of general social life".

Length
The base unit of Korean length is the foot, with other units changing over time based on its dimensions and multiples. Different ancient Korean kingdoms had different exact measurements; that of Sejong the Great (.1418–1450) was 31.22cm. Under the early Joseon Kingdom, the value of the foot varied by trade, with different lengths used for the carpentry foot and the fabric foot.

The biggest difference between the traditional Korean and Chinese units of length is that the Korean equivalent of the bu uses a different character and its pre-Tang composition of six Korean feet rather than five. (The bu was usually treated as a synonym of this unit within Korea but sometimes distinguished as a length of 4feet). In 369 CE, during the reign of King Geunchogo of Baekje, his realm seems to have used a foot of about 28.85cm.

The Korean li previously bore values around 434.16m (3rd century), 531.18m (6th–7th), 559.8m (7th–10th), 552.96m (10th–14th), and 450m (19th); it was also reckoned based on travel time and therefore varied in length between the plains and mountains.

Area
The base unit of Korean area is the pyeong, equivalent to a square kan or 36 square Korean feet. It comprised about 3.158m2 during Korea's Three Kingdoms Era; the present value derives from the units established by the Japanese. Despite being notionally illegal, the pyeong remains particularly common when discussing residential and commercial floorspace and tiles. A separate pyeong of 0.09m2 was used for selling glass. The floorspace pyeong is still prevalent enough that it continues to be glossed in the government's promotional material for foreign investors.

Farms and large estates were formerly generally measured in majigi, which is notionally not based on multiples of the pyeong but on the amount of land suitable for the planting of one mall of rice or grain seed. In practice, it was standardized to the pyeong system but varied in size from province to province based on the average richness of their soil.

Weight
The base unit of Korean weight is the gwan. At the time of Korea's metrification, however, the pound was in more common use. Although it was usually taken as equivalent to 600g, as with red pepper and meats, a separate pound of 400g was used for fruits and another of 375 or 200g was used for vegetables. The nyang also sees some use among Korea's vendors of traditional Chinese medicine.

The "bag" (kama) was a variable unit usually figured as 54kg of unhusked rice or 60kg of polished rice, although 90kg "bags" were also used.

Volume
The base unit of Korean volume or capacity is the doi.

In 3rd-century Gaya, the mal was reckoned at about 2L, the size of the present-day doe. In the early 17th century, the Joseon picul was reckoned as 15 or 20 mal, but similarly only comprised 89.464 or 119.285L owing to the smaller size of the mal at that time.

The United Nations also reported a "small mal" half the size of the standard mal. In contexts involving volume, two cubic forms of "pyeong" were also formerly used. Palais reports alternate seoks of 15 and 20 mal each.

See also
 Metric system
Chinese, Taiwanese, Hong Kong, Japanese, Mongolian & Vietnamese units of measurement
 Korean units of currency
 KATS, KSA, KRISS, & KASTO, South Korean standards organizations
 CIM & SAQM, North Korean standards organizations

Notes

References

Citations

Sources 

 .
 .
 .
 .
 .
 
 .
 .
 .
 .
 .
 .
 .
 .
 .
 .
 .
 .
 
 .
 .
 .
 .
 .
 .
 .
 .
 .
 .
 .
 .
 .
 .
 .
 .

External links
 An automatic converter for metric and customary US and Korean units

Customary units of measurement
Units
Systems of units
Korea